Lake Roberts, just south of Florida State Road 429, is a natural freshwater lake on the west side of Orlando, Florida, in Orange County, Florida. This lake is almost entirely surrounded by residential housing. It has a swampy area on its northeast and the only public access is along a short stretch of McKinnon Road that runs along a very small part of the southeast shore of the lake. As that stretch is brushy it would probably even be unsuitable for fishing.

References

Lakes of Orange County, Florida